Walter I (died c. 1199) was a 12th-century Augustinian Anglo-Norman prelate active in the kingdom of Scotland.

A canon of St Andrews Cathedral Priory (in Fife), he was precentor of the cathedral when he became prior of St Andrews in 1160. Walter Bower, our principal source for Walter, says that he served as prior for 24 years before resigning on grounds of ill-health. Bower's "24 years" is probably a mistake for "34 years", as other sources attest his priorship from his accession in 1160 (the Chronicle of Melrose) to his last charter appearance in 1195.

His successor was Gilbert I. Gilbert died within a few years of taking office, in later 1198 or early 1199, and because of this Walter briefly resumed office. Walter died "within the same year" [Bower], probably sometime in 1199. Thomas, the former sub-prior, is attested as prior of St Andrews for the first time in a document dating to 6 June 1199. Walter's time as prior coincided with the episcopates of bishops Ernald, Richard, John the Scot, Hugh and Roger de Beaumont.

Notes

References

 
 
 

12th-century births
1190s deaths
Priors of St Andrews